The 2016 Exeter City Council election took place on 5 May 2016, to elect members of Exeter City Council in England. Following boundary changes, the entire council was up for election, and all 13 wards were contested, each electing three councillors. The election was held concurrently with other local elections held in England on the 5 May.

The council had been controlled by the Labour Party since 1990, which had held an outright majority since 2012. Labour won the Exeter election, extending their control to 30 seats, their highest ever share of the vote. The Conservatives came in second place with eight seats, losing four to Labour, while the Liberal Democrats won a single seat.

The election for the Devon and Cornwall Police and Crime Commissioner was also scheduled for the 5 May. Voters in Exeter would cast a separate ballot for the office, in conjunction with the residents of the rest of the Devon and Cornwall police area.

Background 
The elections to Exeter City Council were the first to be held since the Local Government Boundary Commission for England conducted a review into the electoral arrangements in Exeter. The review was prompted by the previous council that had a high level of electoral inequality, with some councillors representing many more voters than others. The old council consisted of 40 councillors from 18 wards, each of two or three councillors, which were elected by thirds over a four-year cycle, with elections to Devon County Council on the fourth year. This resulted in some wards having elections every year, while others would have one year in the cycle with no elections. The review resulted in the number of councillors being reduced to 39 and the number of wards reduced to 13, with each ward returning three councillors. The ward changes equalised the ratio of voters to councillors, and provided for the entire city being able to vote in local elections every year.

As a result of the review, for 2016 all seats on the council were up for election. The election used the plurality-at-large voting system; each voter was able to cast up to three votes, with the three candidates with the highest number of votes being elected. As the council would revert to electing by thirds in 2018, a number of councillors would serve partial terms in the interim. In each ward, the councillor who received the highest number of votes would serve a four-year term, the councillor with the second highest number a three-year term, and the councillor with the third-highest votes would have a two-year term. In future elections, each councillor would serve a full four-year term.

Before 5 May 2016 the council was controlled by the Labour Party which had held a majority on the council since the 2012 election, and had traditionally been the largest party in the city. After the previous election, which was held in 2015 for a third of the councillors, the council consisted of 29 Labour members, 10 Conservatives, and one Liberal Democrat.

Campaign 
A total of 138 candidates stood for election across the city. Four parties stood in every ward in the city, with both the Labour and Conservative parties putting up candidates for all 39 seats. The Green Party had the next highest number of candidates with 27, and the Liberal Democrats stood 20 candidates across the city. The UK Independence Party had 12 candidates standing in nine wards, and one person represented the Independence from Europe party.

The Labour Party were standing on their record in office and their key redevelopment plans for the former bus station, which would include the St Sidwell's Point leisure complex in the centre of the city. Labour also aimed to reduce traffic congestion, add a food waste collection, and reduce homelessness and the lack of affordable housing. The Conservatives campaigned against the St Sidwell's Point project on cost grounds, instead promising to invest in affordable housing, cultural venues, and producing a new transport plan for Exeter. The party aimed to improve on its low number of seats on the council. The Liberal Democrats planned to rebuild their former presence in Exeter, focusing on improving the quality of public services. The Green Party proposed a more environmentally sound city, focusing on improving the quality of life for residents, a sustainable development plan, and reducing waste from the city. They also planned to make the council more democratic and accountable to the people of Exeter. UKIP had a national plan for local councils, which included devolution of power to local authorities, attempting to end funding and projects from the European Union and prioritising locals in service provision.

Results 
The election was won by the Labour Party, who won 30 of the 39 seats on the council. The Conservative Party came second, winning eight seats, and the Liberal Democrats had one councillor elected. The overall turnout was 39.14%. Labour extended its majority to 10 councillors – the party's largest ever majority on the council – by gaining three seats from the Conservatives. Labour won all three seats in eight wards, and won at least one seat in every ward except the suburban Topsham, won by the Conservatives. The Conservatives also won five other seats across the city. One ward, Duryard & St James, was split three ways between the parties.

Ward results 
An asterisk (*) denotes an incumbent councillor seeking re-election.

Alphington

Duryard & St James

Exwick

Heavitree

Mincinglake & Whipton

Newtown & St Leonards

Pennsylvania

Pinhoe

Priory

St Davids

St Loyes

St Thomas

Topsham

References

External links 
Exeter City Council
Exeter 2016 local election results

2016 English local elections
2016
2010s in Exeter